The 2015 Aegon Championships, also known traditionally as the Queen's Club Championships, was a men's tennis tournament played on outdoor grass courts. It was the 113th edition of those championships and was part of the ATP World Tour 500 series of the 2015 ATP World Tour, upgraded from a 250 series event for the first time. It took place at the Queen's Club in London, United Kingdom between 15 June and 21 June 2015.

Despite the elevated status of the event from an ATP 250 to an ATP 500 series event, the draw featured one round less for the first time in its history, meaning reduced numbers of players in the draw. However, there were no byes into the second round for any of the higher-ranked players, as there were previously.

First-seeded Andy Murray won the singles title.

Points and prize money

Point distribution

Prize money 

*per team

Singles main draw entrants

Seeds

 Rankings are as of June 8, 2015.

Other entrants
The following players received wildcards into the singles main draw:
  Lleyton Hewitt
  Thanasi Kokkinakis
  James Ward

The following players received entry from the qualifying draw:
  Simone Bolelli
  Jared Donaldson
  Lu Yen-hsun
  Paul-Henri Mathieu

Withdrawals
Before the tournament
  Julien Benneteau →replaced by Gilles Müller
  Leonardo Mayer →replaced by João Sousa

Doubles main draw entrants

Seeds

 Rankings are as of June 8, 2015.

Other entrants
The following pairs received wildcards into the doubles main draw:
  Lleyton Hewitt /  Thanasi Kokkinakis
  Dominic Inglot /  Andy Murray

The following pair received entry from the qualifying draw:
  Chris Guccione /  André Sá

Finals

Singles

  Andy Murray defeated  Kevin Anderson, 6–3, 6–4

Doubles

  Pierre-Hugues Herbert /  Nicolas Mahut defeated  Marcin Matkowski /  Nenad Zimonjić, 6–2, 6–2

References

External links
 Official website 
 ATP tournament profile

 
Aegon Championships
Queen's Club Championships
Aegon Championships
Aegon Championships
Aegon Championships